Ingrid Nilsen (born February 2, 1989) is an American YouTube personality from Rowland Heights, California.

Career

Nilsen began a YouTube channel with the name Missglamorazzi on October 23, 2009, because she wanted to share her feeling of confidence with other people and push herself to overcome her fear of public speaking. She told herself to do something that scared her, and creating a YouTube channel fell under that category for her. In her videos, she covers topics such as fashion, lifestyle, and make-up.

Nilsen also maintains a second channel on YouTube entitled "TheGridMonster" on which she posts her vlogs and more candid content.

In mid-2014, Nilsen began working with CoverGirl, becoming the first YouTube personality to represent the brand.

In late 2014, Nilsen became a judge on the reality television show Project Runway: Threads. At the 2014 Teen Choice Awards and 2015 Teen Choice Awards, Nilsen was nominated for Choice Web Star: Fashion/Beauty.

On January 15, 2016, Nilsen interviewed Barack Obama in a livestream hosted at the White House. She raised questions about the future of terrorism in the United States, taxation of feminine hygiene products, and discrimination against LGBT+ people. Nilsen also asked Obama to share the story behind an item of personal significance during the interview, to which Obama showed a series of small totems, stating each one reminds him "of all the different people [he's] met along the way".

In March 2016, Nilsen was named one of the United Nations Change Ambassadors to the intergovernmental organization along with six other female YouTube creators. The UN Change Ambassadors focused on the global fight for gender equality, one of the UN's 17 Sustainable Development Goals established that year.

In mid-2016, Nilsen was named one of the SuperSoul100, Oprah Winfrey and OWN's list of innovators and visionaries aligned on a mission to move humanity forward.

In July 2016, Nilsen, Do Something, and U by Kotex launched Power To The Period, the first nationwide period product drive. The campaign encouraged participants to run product drives for unopened tampons, pads, and panty liners that were then donated to local homeless shelters. As of September 2016, Power to the Period had donated almost 240,000-period products.

In October 2016, Nilsen was included on OUT magazine's OUT100 list.

On December 4, 2016, The Trevor Project awarded Nilsen the Trevor Digital Innovator Award. "With a powerful social presence, Ingrid has used technology for the better and built a platform and voice to advocate for equality," said Abbe Land, Executive Director and CEO of The Trevor Project. "She is a role model of her generation and truly is a beacon of hope. She continues to push boundaries and believes in the mission of The Trevor Project, making her the perfect fit for the award."

In February 2017, Nilsen and Shiseido-owned bareMinerals announced a partnership, and Nilsen became the face of the brand's two best-selling foundations. The partnership was one of the biggest deals between a beauty brand and an influencer to date.

In June 2019, Nilsen partnered with a nonprofit It Gets Better for a new campaign. Nilsen led #TheirStory campaign which asked LGBTQ+ members and their allies to share stories about inspirational figures via online videos. This campaign was covered on Instagram, TikTok, and YouTube. She attempted to raise $50,000.

On June 30, 2020, Nilsen announced through her YouTube channel she would no longer be uploading to YouTube.

Nilsen now co-owns and runs the artisanal candle company The New Savant.

Personal life
Ingrid is of Norwegian descent on her father's side and Thai on her mother's side. On June 9, 2015, Nilsen uploaded a video on her YouTube channel, in which she came out as lesbian.

From September 2015 to January 2016, Nilsen dated fellow YouTuber Hannah Hart. Nilsen has since begun a relationship with Erica Anderson. They announced their relationship on Instagram in 2018.

Awards and nominations

References

External links 
 Ear Biscuits: Ep. 78 Ingrid Nilsen (interview podcast, 2015)

1989 births
Living people
American lesbian actresses
LGBT people from California
American people of Thai descent
American people of Norwegian descent
People from Los Angeles County, California
American YouTubers
LGBT YouTubers
American LGBT people of Asian descent
20th-century LGBT people
21st-century LGBT people
Articles containing video clips